Raihan Ali Merchant is a Pakistani businessman and the founder of Brainchild communications. He is currently the Chairman and CEO of Z2C Pakistan, Chairman of Brainchild Communications Ltd. and Blitz (Pvt) Ltd. In 2012, the government of Pakistan awarded him the Tamgha-e-Imtiaz (Medal of Excellence) for public service, recognizing his contributions to the advertising industry of Pakistan. Merchant has served on the advisory boards of a number of public and business organizations, and currently sits on the Board of Engro Corporation.

Early life and education 
Raihan Ali Merchant was born in Karachi on September 9, 1967. He was educated at the Bai Virbaiji Soparivala (BVS) Parsi High School in Karachi, and then at the Institute of Business Administration (IBA), where he received his Master in Business Administration (MBA) degree.

Career 
Merchant started Pakistan's first media agency in 1997.

Early career 
After completing his MBA from the Institute of Business Administration, Merchant joined the advertising industry of Pakistan. He worked on multiple well-known brands including Citibank, Coca-Cola, and P&G, and eventually formed Pak Mediacom, the first media buying house to open in Pakistan.

Brainchild Communications 

Brainchild Communication was founded by Raihan Merchant in 2010. It is affiliated with the Publicis brand Starcom, with clients like Procter & Gamble, Coca-Cola, Mondelez, China Mobile, Engro Foods, and National Foods.

Content Monetization 
Brainchild Communications has been a stakeholder in content monetization ventures like PSL and Coke Studio.

Coke Studio 
The concept of Coke Studio was a joint effort between Brainchild Communications and the marketing team at Coca-Cola

Pakistan Super League (PSL) 
Merchant was also instrumental in the launch of the Pakistan Super League, the biggest sporting event in Pakistan. He is currently working on monetizing sports in Pakistan.

Recognition 
In 2012, the President of Pakistan awarded Merchant with the Tamgha-e-Imtiaz for public service. He is also frequently quoted to be one of the most influential media industry executives in Pakistan.

References

Living people
Advertising people
Institute of Business Administration, Karachi alumni
Pakistani chief executives
Recipients of Tamgha-e-Imtiaz
Pakistani company founders
Businesspeople from Karachi
Year of birth missing (living people)